De la Fosse is a surname of French origin, and may refer to:

 Antoine de La Fosse (c. 1653–1708), French playwright
 Charles de La Fosse (1636–1716), French painter, uncle to Antoine
 Charles-Alexandre Coëssin de la Fosse (1829–1910), French painter and engraver
 Eustache de la Fosse (c. 1451–1523), Flemish-speaking sailor 
 Louis Remy de la Fosse (c. 1659–1726), French architect

See also
 Arboretum de la Fosse in Fontaine-les-Coteaux, France
Delafosse

Surnames of French origin